Mordellistena aethiops is a species of beetle in the genus Mordellistena of the family Mordellidae discovered in 1882. Its larvae feed on the stems of Silphium laciniatum.

References

aethiops
Beetles described in 1882